Sevsky (masculine), Sevskaya (feminine), or Sevskoye (neuter) may refer to:
Sevsky District, a district of Bryansk Oblast, Russia
Sevsky Urban Administrative Okrug, an administrative division which the town of Sevsk and four rural localities in Sevsky District of Bryansk Oblast, Russia are incorporated as
Sevskoye Urban Settlement, a municipal formation which Sevsky Urban Administrative Okrug in Sevsky District of Bryansk Oblast, Russia is incorporated as
Sevskoye (rural locality), a rural locality (a settlement) in Kaliningrad Oblast, Russia